Prasophyllum solstitium is a species of orchid endemic to the Northern Tablelands of New South Wales. It has a single tubular, bright green leaf and up to thirty five greenish-pink to purplish-red flowers crowded on the flowering stem. It grows in grassland on heavy basalt soil.

Description
The flowers are greenish-pink to purplish-red and strongly fragrant. As with others in the genus, the flowers are inverted so that the labellum is above the column rather than below it. The edges of the labellum are flared and wavy near the tip and there is a fleshy green callus near its centre. Flowering occurs from December to January.

Taxonomy and naming
Prasophyllum solstitium was first formally described in 2000 by David Jones from a specimen collected near the road between Guyra and Ebor and the description was published in The Orchadian.

Distribution and habitat
This leek orchid grows in grassland on heavy, black basaltic soil on the New England Tableland.

References

External links 
 
 

solstitium
Flora of New South Wales
Endemic orchids of Australia
Plants described in 2000